Maatstaf was a Dutch literary magazine, founded in 1953 by Bert Bakker. Bakker, who was the magazine's first editor, is credited with bringing in poets such as Ida Gerhardt. The magazine had a reputation for publishing "realist" authors (such as Maarten 't Hart), and was categorized as "neoromantic," one of a number of Dutch literary magazines in an "anti-experimental tradition." Dutch poet Gerrit Komrij, who edited the magazine from 1969 on, was the subject of a themed issue in 1984, and again in 1996, this last time centered on a collection of ten homo-erotic poems he had published in 1978, Capriccio. In that same year, 1996, the magazine, with a new team of editors, was renewed following a "conservative revolution."

Maatstaf was a leading magazine for Dutch poetry until the 1970s, when it was supplanted by magazines such as De Revisor and Raster. In 1999, De Arbeiderspers ceased its publication.

Editors
 Gerrit Komrij (1969 - ?)
 Mensje van Keulen (1972 - 1980)

References

1953 establishments in the Netherlands
1999 disestablishments in the Netherlands
Defunct magazines published in the Netherlands
Defunct literary magazines published in Europe
Dutch-language magazines
Literary magazines published in the Netherlands
Magazines established in 1953
Magazines disestablished in 1999